John Edmund Hare (born 26 July 1949) is a British classicist, philosopher, ethicist, and currently Noah Porter Professor of Philosophical Theology at Yale University.

Biography
He received a Bachelor of Arts honours in Literae Humaniores in 1971 from Balliol College, Oxford, and a PhD in classical philosophy from Princeton University in 1975. He was a visiting assistant professor at the University of Michigan in 1975, a professor of philosophy at Lehigh University from 1975 to 1989, and Professor of Philosophy at Calvin College from 1989 to 2003. Hare served on the staff of the United States House Committee on Foreign Affairs from 1982–83, and was selected to give the Gifford Lectures at the University of Glasgow in 2005. He has been the Noah Porter Professor of Philosophical Theology at Yale University since 2003.

Hare has been on the editorial boards of several academic journals, including The Journal of Religious Ethics, American Philosophical Quarterly, History of Philosophy Quarterly, and Ancient Philosophy, and currently serves on the boards of the Yale Center for Bioethics, Yale Center for Faith and Culture and Berkeley Divinity School.

Philosophical views
The author of over sixty articles in scholarly journals, Hare has worked on a wide range of topics, including ancient philosophy, medieval Franciscan philosophy, Immanuel Kant, Søren Kierkegaard, contemporary ethical theory, the theory of the atonement, medical ethics, international relations and aesthetics.

The son of the British utilitarian R. M. Hare, Hare has created an ethical theory which integrates Kantian deontological ethics with utilitarian consequentialism. Unlike his father's, Hare's philosophy is specifically Christian and includes elements of Divine command theory.

In The Moral Gap (1996), Hare outlined and analyzed various philosophers' responses to the gap — which he finds to be identified in Kant's writings — between human ethical ability and human ethical duty; between what is possible and what is required. He sees this "moral gap" as ultimately unbridgeable apart from religion. In God's Call (2001), Hare addresses the "moral gap" with a discussion of the divine command theory of morality, and argues against J. B. Schneewind's secularized reading of Kant's philosophy.

In Why Bother Being Good? (2002), Hare delivers a non-technical apologetic for Christian beliefs and argues that morality cannot be adequately grounded in reason alone but needs a firm basis in faith, or something that will do the work theology has done for the Western tradition in the past. In God and Morality: A Philosophical History (2007), Hare evaluates the ethical theories of Aristotle, Duns Scotus, Immanuel Kant, and the author's father, R. M. Hare, with close attention to the similarities among the philosophers and the relationship of their work to theism.

Awards and honors
Hare has given been the Calvin Lecturer (1999–2000), the Stob Lecturer (1999), the Gifford Lecturer (2005), and the Plantinga Lecturer (2008). He held the senior fellowship at the Center for Philosophy of Religion at the University of Notre Dame from 1998–99, and again from 2008-09. In 1997, Hare was the recipient of the Institute for Advanced Christian Studies Book Prize and held the Pew Evangelical Fellowship from 1991–92. He was also a Congressional Fellow of the American Philosophical Association from 1981–82, and a visiting fellow in the humanities at the Medical College of Pennsylvania from 1978-81. Hare is the recipient of the Junior Lindback Award for Distinguished Teaching (1981) and was elected an honorary member of Phi Beta Kappa (1979).

Personal
Hare worked as a teacher at Tyndale Biscoe School in Kashmir (India) from 1966-67. He is a published composer of liturgical compositions for choir and organ.

Bibliography
God and Morality: A Philosophical History, (Malden, Mass.: Blackwell Publishing, 2007). 
Why Bother Being Good?, (Downers Grove, Ill.: InterVarsity Press, 2002). 
 Por Que Ser Bom?, (Editoria Vida, 2002, translation of Why Bother Being Good?)
God's Call: Moral Realism, God's Commands, and Human Autonomy, (Grand Rapids, Mich.: Eerdmans, 2001). 
The Moral Gap (New York: Oxford University Press, 1996). 
Ethics and International Affairs, 1982, with Carey B. Joynt 
Plato's Euthyphro, 1981

See also
 American philosophy
 List of American philosophers

References

External links

Hare's Yale profile.
Hare's CV.
Articles by Hare at the "Virtual Library of Christian Philosophy" 
Book review by Hare of Divine Motivation Theory by Linda Zagzebski.
Hare's Gifford Lectures profile.

Alumni of Balliol College, Oxford
American philosophers
Analytic philosophers
Kantian philosophers
Moral realists
Philosophers of religion
Christian philosophers
Calvin University faculty
Lehigh University faculty
Yale University faculty
Living people
1949 births
University of Michigan staff